Katak or Kotok or Kotk or Kotak  or Kotek may refer to:
 Katak, Chaharmahal and Bakhtiari
 Katak-e Olya, Chaharmahal and Bakhtiari Province
 Katak-e Sofla, Chaharmahal and Bakhtiari Province
 Katak, Arsanjan, Fars Province
 Katak, Firuzabad, Fars Province
 Katak, Lamerd, Fars Province
 Katak, Gilan
 Kotk, Kerman
 Katak, Khuzestan
 Kotak, Kohgiluyeh and Boyer-Ahmad
 Katak, Kurdistan

Persons

 Alan Kotok (1941–2006), American computer scientist

See also
 Kotak (disambiguation)